Leandro is a masculine Italian, Portuguese and Spanish given name. The name is a variant of two other names: Leander, a character in the Greek myth Hero and Leander, and Lysander, a relative of the Greek name Alexander. There's also a variation of the name in French: Léandre.

Given name 
 Leandro de Sevilla (534–600), bishop of Seville honored as a saint in the Roman Catholic Church
 Leandro Alem (1841–1896), Argentine politician and founder of the Radical Civic Union
 Leandro Marcolini Pedroso de Almeida (born 1982), Brazilian-Hungarian footballer
 Leandro Augusto (born 1977), Brazilian footballer
 Leandro Lessa Azevedo (born 1980), Brazilian footballer
 Leandro Baccaro (born 1973), Argentine field hockey player
 Leandro Barbosa (born 1982), Brazilian basketball player
 Leandro Bassano (1557–1622), Italian artist
 Leandro Bottasso (born 1986), Argentine track and road cyclist
 Leandro Campagna (born 1994), Italian footballer
 Leandro Cedeño (born 1998), Venezuelan baseball player
 Leandro Chaparro (born 1991), Argentine footballer
 Leandro Damião (born 1989), Brazilian footballer
 Leandro Gomes (born 1976), Azerbaijani footballer
 Leandro Grimi (born 1985), Argentine footballer
 Leandro Joaquim Ribeiro (born 1995), Brazilian footballer
 Leandro de Oliveira da Luz (born 1983), Brazilian footballer
 Leandro Ruiz Machado (born 1977), Brazilian water polo player
 Leandro Moldes (born 1986), German/Swiss singer
 Leandro Montagud (born 1989), Spanish footballer
 Leandro Fernández de Moratín (1760–1828), Spanish dramatist
 Leandro de Deus Santos (born 1977), Brazilian footballer
 Leandro da Silva (disambiguation), multiple persons
 Leandro Dos Santos (born 1986), Brazilian footballer known by the mononym Leandro
 José Leandro Ferreira (born 1959), Brazilian footballer
 Leandro V. Locsin, Philippine National Artist for Architecture
 Leandro (Leandro Bernardi Silva; born 1979), Brazilian footballer
 Leandro Verì (1903–1938), Italian carabiniere
 Weverson Leandro Oliveira Moura (born 1993), known as Leandro, Brazilian footballer who plays in Japan

Italian variant 
 Aleandro

References 

Spanish masculine given names